Kate Karlina Krēsliņa (born 14 April 1996) is a Latvian basketball player for Fordham Rams and the Latvian national team.

She participated at the EuroBasket Women 2017.

References

External links

1996 births
Living people
Fordham Rams women's basketball players
Latvian expatriate basketball people in the United States
Latvian women's basketball players
Small forwards
Basketball players from Riga